Sir Frederick Horace Lawton (21 December 1911 – 3 February 2001) was a British barrister and judge who served as Lord Justice of Appeal from 1972 to 1986.

Early life and career

Frederick Lawton was born in Wandsworth, London, the son of William John Lawton and Ethel, née Hanley. His father, a former insurance agent, had joined the Prison Service, and became Governor of Wandsworth Prison, the first prison governor to rise from the ranks. He was educated at Battersea Grammar School and then at Corpus Christi College, Cambridge, where he took first-class honours in part one of the History tripos and an upper second-class honours in part two of the Law tripos.

After flirting with Communism there, Lawton joined the British Union of Fascists and founded the Cambridge University Fascist Association.

Early legal career

Lawton was called to the bar at the Inner Temple in 1935, and joined the chambers of Norman Birkett — 1 Brick Court. As a junior barrister, he defended members of the BUF charged under the Public Order Act 1936. Around that time he converted to Catholicism, which became an important part of his life.

On 4 August 1937 Lawton married Doreen Wilton a typist and the daughter of a Prison Service clerical officer; they had two sons.

Lawton trained in the London Irish Rifles in World War II but was unfit for service after a training accident in 1941. He had ended his association with the Far Right and he later joined the Conservative Party. Resuming his practice at the bar, initially at Sir Edward Marshall Hall's 3 Temple Gardens, then at 5 King's Bench Walk.

He reached a new level of casework in 1942, when he defended Harry Dobkin, a fire-watcher who murdered his wife during the Blitz. He became known as a leading criminal barrister. He stood in civil matters, notably in defamation cases. Among his cases were the 1956 prosecution of the Soviet discus thrower Nina Ponomaryova for shoplifting, the defence of the train driver who drove into a stationary train in the 1957 Lewisham rail crash, and the 1959 defence of Guenther Podola, a seasoned criminal, who murdered a police man.

Lawton became a Queen's Counsel in 1957, and was appointed Recorder of Cambridge the same year. As such he was reportedly the highest earner at the criminal bar. He was highly regarded as a pupil master. Amongst his pupils were Margaret Thatcher and Robin Day.

Judicial career

High Court 
Lawton was appointed to the High Court of Justice in 1961, assigned to the Queen's Bench Division, and received the customary knighthood. In 1967, he oversaw the jury trial of the gangster Charlie Richardson (around whom the Richardson Gang was based). He sentenced him to 25 years' imprisonment. In 1969 he oversaw that of the rival gang's Kray twins, who convictions for two murders, for a third murder; they were acquitted.

On the civil side, in 1964 Lawton presided over the high-profile libel case bought by Polish-born Dr Wladislaw Dering against the American novelist Leon Uris. As the case concerned certain events during the Holocaust some expressed doubt about Lawton's suitability for the case, given his former fascism. In the event, his adjudication prompted no adverse publicity. In 1970, he adjudged Broome v Cassell & Co Ltd, another high-profile libel trial as to certain events in World War II.

When adjudicating criminal matters, Lawton was regarded as efficient and fair, though prone to pass severe sentences in serious cases.

Court of Appeal 
Lawton was appointed a Lord Justice of Appeal in 1972, and was sworn of the Privy Council. In 1973, he criticised the Director of Public Prosecutions for offering Bertie Smalls, the first so-called "supergrass", immunity in exchange for his testimony. The law lords referred to the transaction as an "unholy deal", but allowed it to stand.

Lawton was influential in advocating for sentencing guidelines and for the expanded use of non-custodial sentences. He was a member of the Criminal Law Revision Committee from 1959 to 1985, and its chairman from 1977. On his appointment as chair, the barrister Louis Blom-Cooper described him as "the most knowledgeable and robust exponent of the criminal justice system as an effective instrument of social control".

Lawton retired in 1986.

Stance and remarks 
Sir Frederick made at least four socially divisive or claimed as exaggerative remarks, noted by reporters at the time:

In 1967 he sentenced Charlie Richardson to serve 25 years for his conviction by jury for torture, amounting to grievous bodily harm, coupled with fraud and affray. He added "one is ashamed to live in a society that contains men like you."
He more controversially opined "wife beating may be socially acceptable in Sheffield, but it is a different matter in Cheltenham."
In 1981, when demonstrators for nuclear disarmament turned to violence he remarked that "a good South Devon bull might work wonders" — the demonstrations took place in Cornwall nearby, with an early 19th century tradition of magistrates putting down riots fiercely.
In 1987, after he retired, he complained of the difficulty prosecuting "the gyppos and tinkers who invade a farmer's land".

Cases
In the Court of Appeal his reported decisions include:

Lawton was also involved in the early appeals of the Guildford Four.

Sources
 Obituary – The Daily Telegraph
 Obituary – The Guardian

Footnotes and references

Footnotes

Citations

1911 births
2001 deaths
Alumni of Corpus Christi College, Cambridge
People educated at Battersea Grammar School
English King's Counsel
English Roman Catholics
Lords Justices of Appeal
Members of the Inner Temple
Members of the Privy Council of the United Kingdom
20th-century King's Counsel
Knights Bachelor
English fascists
People from Wandsworth
English barristers
Lawyers from London
20th-century English lawyers
British Army personnel of World War II
London Irish Rifles soldiers
Military personnel from London